Jaujac is a commune in the Ardèche department in southern France.

It was the site of the love story of Guillem de Balaun, the historicity of which is dubious.

Geography
The village lies in the northeastern part of the commune, on the right bank of the river Lignon, which flows northeast through the commune.

Population

See also
Communes of the Ardèche department

References

Communes of Ardèche
Ardèche communes articles needing translation from French Wikipedia